The 2014 UCLA Bruins men's soccer team is the college's 79th season of playing organized men's college soccer, and their fifth season playing in the Pac-12 Conference. The Bruins ended the season as the No. 2 seed in the NCAA Championship tournament. They were defeated in the championship game by No. 16 seed Virginia in penalty kicks 4-2.

Background

Roster

Standings

Schedule

Statistics

Transfers

In

Out

See also 

 UCLA Bruins men's soccer
 2014 Pac-12 Conference men's soccer season
 2014 NCAA Division I men's soccer season
 2014 NCAA Division I Men's Soccer Championship

References 

Ucla Bruins
UCLA Bruins men's soccer seasons
Ucla Bruins
Ucla Bruins
NCAA Division I Men's Soccer Tournament College Cup seasons